The 2004 Slovak Cup Final was the final match of the 2003–04 Slovak Cup, the 35th season of the top cup competition in Slovak football. The match was played at the DAC Stadion in Dunajská Streda on 8 May 2004 between FC Artmedia Petržalka and FC Steel Trans Ličartovce. Artmedia defeated Ličartovce 2-0.

Route to the final

Match

Details

References

Slovak Cup Finals
Slovak Cup
Cup Final